James Heyes (born 1902) was an English professional footballer who played as an inside forward for Sunderland.

References

1902 births
Sportspeople from Northwich
English footballers
Association football inside forwards
Northwich Victoria F.C. players
Sunderland A.F.C. players
West Ham United F.C. players
Connah's Quay & Shotton F.C. players
Bangor City F.C. players
Ashton National F.C. players
Mossley A.F.C. players
English Football League players
Year of death missing